Langru ( / ) is a township in Hotan County, Hotan Prefecture, Xinjiang, China.

History

In 2014, according to one police document obtained by Radio Free Asia, any Uyghur on the police suspect list who failed to present himself or herself to authorities was to have their name "erased from township household registers".

Administrative divisions

Langru includes fifteen villages:

Villages (Mandarin Chinese Hanyu Pinyin-derived names):
Aotakesaiyi, Puji (Pujicun, Pujiya, P'u-chi-ya), Aigusai, Popuna, Tatilikesu, Daoziya, Langru, Kuogaqibashi, Yafuqialike, Qiganlike, Paiziwati, Nusui, Mitizi, Puxia, Tiereke'aledi

References

Populated places in Xinjiang
Township-level divisions of Xinjiang